Acceleration due to gravity, acceleration of gravity or gravity acceleration may refer to:
Gravitational acceleration, the acceleration caused by the gravitational attraction of massive bodies in general
Gravity of Earth, the acceleration caused by the combination of gravitational attraction and centrifugal force of the Earth
Standard gravity, or g, the standard value of gravitational acceleration at sea level on Earth

See also
g-force, the acceleration of a body relative to free-fall